Nocturnal Animals is a 2016 American neo-noir psychological thriller film written, produced, and directed by Tom Ford in his second feature, based on the 1993 novel Tony and Susan by Austin Wright. The film stars Amy Adams, Jake Gyllenhaal, Michael Shannon, Aaron Taylor-Johnson, Isla Fisher, Armie Hammer, Laura Linney, Andrea Riseborough, and Michael Sheen. The plot follows an art gallery owner as she reads the new novel written by her first husband and begins to see the similarities between it and their former relationship.

Principal photography began on October 5, 2015, in Los Angeles. The film premiered at the 73rd Venice International Film Festival on September 2, 2016 and was released in North America on November 18, 2016, by Focus Features. It received positive reviews, with praise for the performances and Ford's direction, and grossed over $32 million worldwide.

Nocturnal Animals was selected to compete for the Golden Lion at the 73rd Venice International Film Festival, where it won the Grand Jury Prize. Shannon earned a nomination for Best Supporting Actor at the 89th Academy Awards. It also received nine BAFTA Award nominations and Golden Globe Award nominations for Best Director and Best Screenplay, plus a Best Supporting Actor win for Taylor-Johnson.

Plot
Art gallery owner Susan Morrow receives the manuscript for a novel written by her estranged ex-husband Edward Sheffield along with an invitation for dinner during Edward's upcoming visit to Los Angeles. Upset by her deteriorating marriage to unfaithful businessman Hutton Morrow, Susan becomes consumed by the novel, which is dedicated to her and named Nocturnal Animals after Edward's nickname for her.

In the novel, Tony Hastings is a family man who runs afoul of three local troublemakers – Ray Marcus, Lou and Turk – during a road trip through West Texas. After being forced off the road, Tony is powerless to stop Ray and Turk from kidnapping his wife, Laura and their daughter, India, leaving him with Lou, who forces him to drive Ray's car to the end of a road where he is abandoned. Tony manages to evade Ray and Lou when they return looking for him and makes his way to a nearby farmhouse to call the police.

Detective Roberto "Bobby" Andes is assigned to the case and with Tony, discovers the bodies of Laura and India near an abandoned shack, where they had been raped and murdered. Tony is wracked with guilt. He is contacted by Andes a year later and is asked to identify Lou, who is charged as an accomplice in the murders of Laura and India.

Turk has been fatally shot in a botched robbery, leaving Ray as the last culprit to be brought to justice. Andes arrests Ray but is forced to release him as they have only circumstantial evidence of his involvement. On the verge of retirement and having been diagnosed with terminal lung cancer, Andes decides to take matters into his own hands and with Tony's help, abducts Ray and Lou. Andes shoots Lou dead when he attempts to flee but Ray escapes.

Tony tracks down Ray to the shack where Laura and India were killed. Ray admits to raping and murdering Tony's wife and daughter, calling him weak. Tony fatally shoots him but is blinded when Ray hits him on the head with a fire poker. Tony stumbles outside and dies after falling on his gun, shooting himself in the abdomen in the process.

Shocked by the dark content and raw emotion of the novel, Susan reminisces about meeting Edward in college and their blossoming relationship, which Susan's domineering mother Anne Sutton objected to, claiming that Edward was not worthy of Susan's affections and that because of his romantic world view, he lacked the drive to achieve his goals; Susan ignored her mother's objections, eventually marrying Edward.

After finding further evidence of Hutton's extramarital affair, Susan resumes her reading of the manuscript and begins to recall her troubled marriage to Edward, which was strained by her frustration with his fledgling career and her dismissive attitude towards his literary aspirations and culminated with Susan cheating on him with Hutton and divorcing Edward to marry him. Edward attempted to repair their relationship but ultimately cut ties with Susan upon learning that she was pregnant with his child but secretly had an abortion to ensure an end to any attachment with him.

In the present day, Susan finishes reading the novel and arranges a meeting with Edward at a restaurant. Edward does not show up and Susan waits alone as the restaurant empties.

Cast

The real world
 Amy Adams as Susan Morrow, a wealthy art gallery owner living in Los Angeles
 Jake Gyllenhaal as Edward Sheffield, Susan's estranged ex-husband and novelist
 Armie Hammer as Hutton Morrow, Susan's second husband, who has been neglectful towards Susan
 Laura Linney as Anne Sutton, Susan's estranged mother
 Andrea Riseborough as Alessia Holt, Carlos' wife
 Michael Sheen as Carlos Holt, Alessia's homosexual husband
 Bobbi Menuez (credited as India Menuez) as Samantha Morrow, Susan's daughter
 Zawe Ashton as Alex, a receptionist
 Jena Malone as Sage Ross, Susan’s young coworker
 Neil Jackson as Christopher, Susan’s attendant
 Kristin Bauer van Straten as Samantha Van Helsing

The novel
 Jake Gyllenhaal as Tony Hastings, a motorist on vacation with his family who is forced off the road by Ray Marcus' gang
 Michael Shannon as Detective Bobby Andes, a dedicated detective for a local police department
 Aaron Taylor-Johnson as Ray Marcus, the sadistic leader of the gang
 Isla Fisher as Laura Hastings, Tony's wife, who is kidnapped by Ray Marcus' gang
 Ellie Bamber as India Hastings, Tony's daughter, who is also kidnapped alongside her mother
 Karl Glusman as Lou Bates, gang member
 Robert Aramayo as Steve "Turk" Adams, gang member
 Graham Beckel as Lieutenant Graves

Production
On March 24, 2015, it was announced that Smokehouse Pictures' partners George Clooney and Grant Heslov would produce a thriller, Nocturnal Animals, based on Austin Wright's 1993 novel Tony and Susan. Tom Ford was set to direct the film, based on his own script. Ford said that the storytelling concept of the novel appealed to him, explaining, "The film is very different than the book it's based on. However, the central themes are the same, meaning that when I read the book, what appealed to me as a writer and a filmmaker was the idea of this device of communicating to someone through a work of fiction. Through a written work of fiction. And thereby communicating something that they had not been able to really communicate clearly. I loved that concept."

Jake Gyllenhaal was set to star in the dual lead roles, Amy Adams was in talks for the female lead role, and sources confirmed that Joaquin Phoenix and Aaron Taylor-Johnson might be cast in other roles. Focus Features acquired the US distribution rights to the film on May 17, 2015, while Universal Pictures handles the international distribution. Focus' deal was made with $20 million, making this the biggest deal of the 2015 Cannes Film Festival, and one of the biggest of the mid 2010s. On August 6, 2015, Taylor-Johnson was confirmed to play a mysterious character who poses a threat to Gyllenhaal's character Tony's family, while Michael Shannon was also added to the cast, playing a detective investigating the violent incident. On August 28, 2015, Armie Hammer also joined the cast of the film, to play Hutton Morrow, Adams' character's husband. On September 9, 2015, Isla Fisher joined the film to play Laura Hastings, Tony's wife. On September 18, 2015, Ellie Bamber was cast in the film to play Tony's daughter. On September 30, 2015, Robert Aramayo was added to the cast. On October 5, 2015, Karl Glusman signed on to star in the film. On October 8, 2015, Peter Nyong'o was also cast in the film.

Principal photography on the film began on October 5, 2015, in Los Angeles. The final scene in the Japanese restaurant was filmed in the main building of the Yamashiro Historic District. It wrapped on December 5, 2015.

Release
Nocturnal Animals had its world premiere at the 73rd Venice International Film Festival on September 2, 2016. The film also screened at the Toronto International Film Festival on September 9, 2016, and at the BFI London Film Festival on October 14, 2016.

The film was released in the United States on November 18, 2016.

Reception

Box office
Nocturnal Animals grossed $10.7 million in the United States and Canada and $20.5 million in other countries for a worldwide total of $31.2 million.

The film had its North American wide release on December 9, 2016, and was projected to open to $3–5 million. It ended up grossing $3.2 million, finishing 7th at the box office.

Critical response
On Rotten Tomatoes, the film has an approval rating of 74% based on 302 reviews, with an average rating of 7.00/10. The website's critical consensus reads, "Well-acted and lovely to look at, Nocturnal Animals further underscores writer-director Tom Ford's distinctive visual and narrative skill." On Metacritic, the film has a score of 67 out of 100, based on 45 critics, indicating "generally favorable reviews".

Owen Gleiberman of Variety praised the film, stating "Tom Ford's first film since A Single Man is another winner", and complimenting the performances of Gyllenhaal, Adams, Shannon and Taylor-Johnson. Pete Hammond of Deadline Hollywood praised Adams, Gyllenhaal, Shannon, and Taylor-Johnson's performances, as well as Ford's screenplay and direction.

Geoffrey Macnab of The Independent awarded the film five stars, praising the performances and the direction, and stating, "Nocturnal Animals is extraordinarily deft in the way it combines romanticism and bleakness. It's a film that easily could have slipped into extreme pretentiousness but it never puts a foot wrong."

Victoria Coren Mitchell of The Guardian opposed the popular critical opinion, saying "Why all these raves and prizes for a piece of gynophobic death-porn?"

Accolades

References

External links 

 
 
 
 Official screenplay

2016 films
2016 psychological thriller films
2016 thriller drama films
American neo-noir films
American nonlinear narrative films
American rape and revenge films
American psychological drama films
American psychological thriller films
American thriller drama films
Films about novels
Films based on American novels
Films directed by Tom Ford
Films featuring a Best Supporting Actor Golden Globe winning performance
Films set in Los Angeles
Films set in New York City
Films set in Texas
Films shot in Los Angeles
Focus Features films
Universal Pictures films
Venice Grand Jury Prize winners
Films about writers
2010s English-language films
2010s American films